Christine Shaw-Checinska is a British womenswear designer and art historian. She is the Curator of African and African Diaspora Fashion at the Victoria and Albert Museum. Her work considers the relationship between cloth, culture and race.

Early life and education 
Checinska studied textile design at the University of the West of England in Bristol and graduate with a bachelor's degree in textile design in 1996. She earned a master's degree at the Surrey Institute of Art & Design in 2002. Checinska moved to Goldsmiths, University of London for her doctoral studies, where she studied the aesthetic of the Windrush generation. She was a postdoctoral researcher at the University of East London where she established the Clothes, Cloth and Culture group. Checinska worked with Iniva (the Institute for International Visual Arts) on several projects, including Cloth & Differences and Social Fabric, which explored textiles and social processes.

Research and career 
Checinska was appointed as a Lecturer in Fashion at Goldsmiths, University of London, and held a joint position at the University of Johannesburg, Visual Identities in Art and Design Research Centre. She has worked as a freelance fashion designer, leading collections for Margaret Howell. Her work considers the relationship between cloth, culture and race; exploring themes such as colonialism and international trade.

In 2016 her show The Arrivants debuted at the University of Johannesburg FADA (Faculty of Art, Design and Architecture) Gallery. The Arrivants considered the intersection of race, culture and fashion, with a particular focus on the role of dress in the negotiation of social borders. Later that year, she delivered a TED Talk that explored fashion as everyday activism. During her talk she coined the phrase "Craftivist".

In 2020, Checinska became the inaugural Curator of African and African Diaspora Fashion at the Victoria and Albert Museum. She is Lead Curator of the Victoria and Albert Museum's major exhibition Africa Fashion (July 2022–April 2023).

References

External links
 Official website

 Christine Checinska – V & A Blog
 "In Conversation with Christine Checinska: Design History and African Diasporas". Association for Art History, 17 November 2021. 

Academics of Goldsmiths, University of London
Alumni of Goldsmiths, University of London
Alumni of the University of East London
Alumni of the University of the West of England, Bristol
Black British artists
Black British women academics
British art historians
British women curators
Living people
People associated with the Victoria and Albert Museum
Academic staff of the University of Johannesburg
Women art historians
Year of birth missing (living people)